The Man from Morocco is a 1945 British action adventure film directed by Mutz Greenbaum as Max Greene and starring Anton Walbrook, Margaretta Scott andMary Morris. The film was shot at Welwyn Studios of Associated British.

Plot
A group of men who have spent two years in an internment camp are sent by the Vichy Government to build a railway in the Sahara. One escapes and returns to London to find his lover believes him to be dead and that she is being pursued by his deadliest enemy.

Cast
 Anton Walbrook as Karel Langer
 Margaretta Scott as Manuela de Roya
 Mary Morris as Sarah Duboste
 Reginald Tate as Captain Ricardi
 Peter Sinclair as Jock
 David Horne as Doctor Duboste
 Hartley Power as Colonel Bagley
 Sybille Binder as Erna
 Charles Victor as Bourdille
 Joseph Almas as Franz
 Carl Jaffe as German General
 Orlando Martins as Jeremiah

Crew
 Director: Max Greene
 Production Company: Associated British Picture Corporation
 Producer: Warwick Ward
 Unit Production Manager: Laurie Lawrence
 1st Assistant Director: Frank Hollands
 2nd Assistant Director: Gerald Mitchell

External links
 

1945 films
1940s action adventure films
British spy films
British black-and-white films
Films set in Morocco
Films set in London
Films set in France
Films set in Spain
World War II films made in wartime
World War II spy films
Films with screenplays by Edward Dryhurst
Films shot at Welwyn Studios
British action adventure films
1940s English-language films
1940s British films